St. Mary of the Assumption High School is a small Catholic high school on Broad Street in Elizabeth, in Union County, New Jersey, United States. The old high school building consists of a three-story brick building with a basement serving as additional classroom space for a total of four floors of education space. The school is affiliated with its parent parish, St. Mary's Church, and operates under the auspices of the Roman Catholic Archdiocese of Newark. The school has been accredited by the Middle States Association of Colleges and Schools Commission on Elementary and Secondary Schools since 1992.

As of the 2017–18 school year, the school had an enrollment of 184 students and 16.1 classroom teachers (on an FTE basis), for a student–teacher ratio of 11.4:1. The school's student body was 50.5% (93) Black, 21.2% (39) Asian, 19.6% (36) two or more races, 6.5% (12) White and 1.1% (2) Hispanic.

History
The school opened in 1930. In June 2019 the school received notice that it was closing that summer, something the principal believed as a surprise. The archdiocese stated that this was because the school had a lot of debt. In response the community established a GoFundMe to work to resolve the issue.

Athletics
The St. Mary of the Assumption High School Hilltoppers compete in the Union County Interscholastic Athletic Conference, which is comprised of public and private high schools in Union County and operates under the supervision of the New Jersey State Interscholastic Athletic Association (NJSIAA). Prior to the 2010 NJSIAA's realignment, the school had participated in the Mountain Valley Conference, which consisted of public and private high schools covering Essex and Union counties in northern New Jersey. With 121 students in grades 10–12, the school was classified by the NJSIAA for the 2019–20 school year as Non-Public B for most athletic competition purposes, which included schools with an enrollment of 37 to 366 students in that grade range (equivalent to Group I for public schools).

School colors are blue and white. Sports offered include baseball (men), basketball (men and women), bowling (men and women).

The boys basketball team won the Non-Public Group A state championship in 1943 (against runner-up St. Peter's Preparatory School in the playoff final), and won the Non-Public B title in 1951 (vs. St. Mary's High School of South Amboy), 1952 (vs. St. Rose High School), 1953 (vs. St. Mary's High School of Perth Amboy), 1954 (vs. St. Joseph's High School of Camden), 1955 (vs. Gloucester Catholic) and 1960 (vs. St. Joseph's of Camden). The program's eight state titles are tied for seventh-most in the state. The 1954 team defeated St. Joseph's of Camden by a score of 54–37 in the Catholic Class B final at the Elizabeth Armory. The 1955 team won the program's fifth consecutive title and won its 20th game of the season with a 54–37 win against Gloucester Catholic in Class B.

The baseball team won the Non-Public Group B state championship in 1963 (defeating St. Mary's High School of South Amboy in the tournament final), 1965 (vs. Gloucester Catholic High School) and 1983 (vs. Gloucester Catholic). The 1983 team finished the season with a 15–9 record after winning the Group B state title with a 5–1 victory against Gloucester Catholic in the championship game.

Notable alumni
Chris Bollwage (born 1955; class of 1972), mayor of Elizabeth, New Jersey.
 Hubie Brown (born 1933; class of 1951), two-time NBA Coach of the Year (1978, 2004) and member of the Basketball Hall of Fame.
 Gage Daye (born 1989), basketball coach and former player.
 Thomas G. Dunn (1921–1998), politician who was the longtime Mayor of Elizabeth, and served in both houses of the New Jersey Legislature.
 Chuck Feeney (born 1931, class of 1949), businessman, philanthropist and the founder of The Atlantic Philanthropies, one of the largest private foundations in the world; his 2016 donation of $250,000 was the largest in school history.
 Robert Sparks (born 1947, class of 1965), former handball player who competed in the 1972 Summer Olympics and in the 1976 Summer Olympics.
 Kevin M. Tucker (1940–2012), Commissioner of the Philadelphia Police Department from 1986 to 1988.

References

External links
St. Mary of the Assumption High School

1930 establishments in New Jersey
Education in Elizabeth, New Jersey
Educational institutions established in 1930
Middle States Commission on Secondary Schools
Private high schools in Union County, New Jersey
Roman Catholic Archdiocese of Newark
Catholic secondary schools in New Jersey